AMEP may refer to:

 Adult Migrant English Program
 AMEP Parekklisia, football club
 Aston Martin Engine Plant
 Australian Motoring Enthusiast Party
 Party of the Hungarian Interest (Hungarian: A Magyar Érdek Pártja)